Nathan Buttke (born May 8, 1975) is a former stock car racing driver. The Randleman, North Carolina native competed in 55 NASCAR Busch Series races and 22 NASCAR Craftsman Truck Series races between 1992 and 2001.

Racing career

Winston West Series
Buttke made one foray into the NASCAR Winston West Series, running one race in 1996 for Spears Motorsports. Running at Mesa Marin Raceway, he qualified fourth and finished in that position.

Craftsman Truck Series
Spears Motorsports signed Buttke partway through the 1996 season to drive the No. 75 entry. He recorded three top ten finishes, but also crashed out of two races and failed to finish five others with mechanical issues. Buttke did not return to the team in 1997, or even the series, focusing his efforts on the Busch Series. He attempted one race in 1998 for CSG Motorsports, finishing seventeenth at New Hampshire. He returned to the series in 2001, running the first eight races of the season for Ware Racing Enterprises. Buttke and the team mutually parted ways before Texas Motor Speedway in June, with Buttke searching for more opportunities.

Busch Series
Breaking into the series in 1992, Buttke drove three races for his family team, finishing 23rd at Orange County Speedway, 17th at Martinsville Speedway, and 19th at Hickory Motor Speedway. In 1993, the team expanded its reach to more than half the schedule, and changed its number from 82 to 66. Buttke attempted nineteen races as part of a campaign for Busch Series Rookie of the Year, qualified for seventeen, and recorded his first career top ten, at Hickory. The following year, he ran five races for his family team and three more for Owen Racing, recording a top ten in the No. 9 car at South Boston Speedway, the track at which he ran best, posting an average finish of 17th. Skipping the 1995 season, he ran seven races and failed to qualify for three more in 1996. He failed to finish six out of seven races that year, including the South Boston race, where he qualified second. He also ran the second half of the Craftsman Truck Series schedule that year for Spears Motorsports. In 1997, after acquiring sponsorship from Carquest Auto Parts, he attempted four of the first ten races and made three. He was then signed by Don Browder and the No. 78 Mark III Racing team. Attempting twelve more races, he posted three top ten starts and a best finish of eleventh at Bristol Motor Speedway. His first opportunity in the 1998 season was to race for Phoenix Racing, running races 22 to 24 on the schedule and placing 22nd at Michigan International Speedway, 9th at bristol, and 17th at Darlington Raceway. He then joined Washington-Erving Motorsports for one race, falling out with brake issues at Dover International Speedway. Finally, Buttke returned to the Mark III team for the final four races of the season. His final Busch race came in 1999, competing at Myrtle Beach Speedway for NorthStar Motorsports, finishing 16th.

Post-NASCAR 
Buttke has remained an active racer at Caraway Speedway and in the Goodyear Challenge Series.

Personal life 
Buttke attended Randleman High School while racing.

Motorsports career results

NASCAR
(key) (Bold – Pole position awarded by qualifying time. Italics – Pole position earned by points standings or practice time. * – Most laps led.)

Busch Series

Craftsman Truck Series

Winston West Series

References

External links
 

1975 births
Living people
People from Randleman, North Carolina
NASCAR drivers
Racing drivers from North Carolina